Gun Shy is a 2000 black comedy film written and directed by Eric Blakeney, and starring Liam Neeson, Oliver Platt and Sandra Bullock.

Plot
Charlie Mayough (Liam Neeson) is an undercover DEA agent suffering from anxiety and gastrointestinal problems after a bust goes wrong. During the aforementioned incident, his partner was killed and he found himself served up on a platter of watermelon with a gun shoved in his face just before back-up arrived. Charlie, once known for his ease and almost "magical" talent on the job, is finding it very hard to return to work. His requests to be taken off the case or retired are denied by his bosses, Lonny Burke (Louis Giambalvo) and Dexter Helvenshaw (Mitch Pileggi) as so much time was put into his cover. Charlie works with the dream of one day retiring to Ocean Views, a luxury housing complex with servants and utilities.

During his flight to New York City, where his job will resume, another passenger strikes up a conversation with him. It turns out that this man, Dr. Jeff Bleckner (Michael Mantell), is a psychiatrist and upon arriving to New York, Charlie enlists his services. Dr. Bleckner listens to his troubles and prescribes him anti-anxiety medication to help him deal with stress. He also encourages him to join a group therapy session. At therapy, Charlie meets and befriends a group of stressed out men from the business world.

To deal with his gastrointestinal issues, Charlie goes to the doctor where he meets the free-spirited and beautiful Judy Tipp (Sandra Bullock), the self-proclaimed "Enema Queen" who introduces him to alternative therapies to his problems as well as some romantic interest.

Back on the job, Charlie is knee-deep in negotiations for high-stakes money laundering and stock manipulation. He was brought into the group by the passionate Fidel Vaillar (José Zúñiga) and his close bodyguard, Estuvio Clavo (Michael DeLorenzo). Vaillar is a son of an important Colombian druglord and fears being viewed as a stereotype. They are dealing with an intense man with an unpredictable temper named Fulvio Nesstra (Oliver Platt) who represents the Italian mob in New York. Fulvio is the disfavored son-in-law of high-ranking Italian mobster, Carmine Minetti (Frank Vincent). Jason Cane (Andrew Lauer), a young Wall Street-type with a plan, but poor taste, completes the group. Each thinks he understands the other players, but there is more to these characters than meets the eye.

Cast

Production
The film was produced by Bullock's production company, Fortis Films, and was the first film directed by Blakeney. Buena Vista Film Sales acquired and financed the film and it was distributed through Hollywood Pictures.

Critical reception
Elvis Mitchell of The New York Times was not enamored with the direction, but was fond of the writing and acting.

Other reviewers were not so kind and it received a score of 26% on Rotten Tomatoes based on 43 reviews, the consensus of which calls the film "a dark comedy of the low brow nature filled with fart and gay jokes." However, the film managed to get a normalized score of 42 out of 100 on Metacritic based on 20 reviews.

Soundtrack
The soundtrack was released on February 4, 2000 by Hollywood Records.
Blue Skies for Everyone - Bob Schneider
Under the Sun - Big Kenny
Drunk is Better Than Dead - The Push Stars
Round & Round - Bob Schneider
This Time - Los Lobos
Is It Too Late? - World Party
More Than Rain - Tom Waits
It's a Man's Man's Man's World - James Brown
Staysha Brown - The Scabs
I'm Your Boogie Man - KC and the Sunshine Band
Start the Commotion - The Wiseguys
Caro Mio Ben - Helga Bullock

References

External links

2000 films
2000 directorial debut films
Hollywood Pictures films
American crime comedy films
Films about psychiatry
Films set in New York City
Films produced by Sandra Bullock
Films scored by Rolfe Kent
2000s English-language films
2000s American films